Costești is a commune located in Vâlcea County, Oltenia, Romania. It is composed of four villages: Bistrița, Costești, Văratici, and Pietreni.

The river Bistrița (also known as Bistrița Vâlceană) and its tributary, the Costești, flow through the commune.

Costești is traversed by national road , which connects Râmnicu Vâlcea to Târgu Jiu and Drobeta-Turnu Severin further west.

 and Bistrița Monastery are located in Costești. Part of the Buila-Vânturarița National Park is situated on the territory of the commune.

References

Communes in Vâlcea County
Localities in Oltenia